Danny Williams is an American politician serving as a member of the Oklahoma House of Representatives from the 28th district. He assumed office in 2020. He serves on the Oklahoma House of Representatives committee on Conference Committee on Technology and Vice chair on Technology.

References

Living people
Year of birth missing (living people)
Republican Party members of the Oklahoma House of Representatives
21st-century American politicians